Patrick Dunn (born 15 March 1963) is a French ice hockey player. He competed in the men's tournament at the 1992 Winter Olympics.

References

1963 births
Living people
Olympic ice hockey players of France
Ice hockey players at the 1992 Winter Olympics
Sportspeople from Trois-Rivières
Ice hockey people from Quebec
Granby Bisons players
Quebec Remparts players
Shawinigan Cataractes players
Trois-Rivières Draveurs players
Rouen HE 76 players
Utah Grizzlies (IHL) players
New Mexico Scorpions (WPHL) players
Tucson Gila Monsters players
Shreveport Mudbugs players